New Zealand has several notable wetlands but 90% of wetland areas have been lost following European settlement.

The Resource Management Act 1991, the major Act of Parliament determining land use, defines wetlands as "permanently or intermittently wet areas, shallow water, and land water margins that support a natural ecosystem of plants and animals that area adapted to wet conditions".  The Ramsar Convention, an international conservation agreement for wetlands to which New Zealand signed up to in 1971, has a wider definition of wetland.

Since the mid-19th century, New Zealand has lost about 90% of its wetland areas due to draining for farming. Many remaining wetlands are also degraded due to pollution, grazing, drainage and presence of invasive plants. In the late 20th and early 21st century, efforts have been made towards wetland conservation.

Ramsar sites

 Awarua Wetland
 Farewell Spit
 Firth of Thames
 Kopuatai Peat Dome
 Manawatu river mouth and estuary
 Wairarapa Moana Wetland
 Whangamarino Wetland

Other wetlands

Other notable wetlands in New Zealand include Ahukawakawa Swamp, Aramoana, the Kepler Mire, Kai Iwi Lakes, the Sinclair Wetlands, and Te Henga, as well as areas around the lower reaches of the Waikato River.

The Rakatu Wetlands in the South Island are part of an ecological restoration project set up address the environmental effects of the construction of the Manapouri Power Station.

Travis Wetland is a restoration project covering  of land in urban Christchurch formerly drained and used as a dairy farm.

See also
Water in New Zealand
Environment of New Zealand

References

Further reading

External links
Department of Conservation – wetlands conservation page
The National Wetland Trust of New Zealand
 Wetlands in Te Ara – the Encyclopedia of New Zealand